War on the Sea is a 2021 World War II video game developed and published by Killerfish Games. The game sees the player controlling either the United States Navy or the Imperial Japanese Navy during the course of the Pacific War. It is a naval real time strategy game. The player can play custom battles, training, and a campaign. The main campaign is set in the Guadalcanal Campaign during the Pacific War, and in every Campaign, the player can choose to take command of the United States Navy or the Imperial Japanese Navy. Several other mods also exist that tweaks the recurring campaign and introducing new campaign including the ABDACOM Defensive (which focused on the Dutch East Indies Campaign) and the Pacific War that encompasses most of the area in the Pacific Ocean.

The game has received mostly positive reviews from players since launch, especially in terms of torpedo reliability.

References

External links

2021 video games
Naval video games
Single-player video games
Submarine simulation video games
Video games developed in Australia
Windows games
World War II video games
MacOS games